Maddocks is a surname. Notable people with the surname include:

Ada Maddocks (1927–2007), British trade unionist
Ann Maddocks (1704–1727), Welsh maid and a figure in Welsh folklore
Anne Maddocks (1911–2006), English musician
Charné Maddocks (born 1998), South African field hockey player
Chris Maddocks (born 1957), English racewalker
David Maddocks (born 1983), Welsh rugby union player
Henry Maddocks (disambiguation), multiple people
Ian Maddocks (born 1951), Australian cricketer
Kenneth Maddocks (1907–2001), British colonial official
Len Maddocks (1926–2016), Australian cricketer
Margaret Maddocks (1906–1993), English writer
Melrick Maddocks, South Africa field hockey
Mildred Maddocks, American cooking journalist and writer
Morris Maddocks (1928–2008), English Anglican bishop
Peter Maddocks (born 1928), English cartoonist
Richard Maddocks (1928–1968), Australian cricketer
Rick Maddocks (born 1970), Canadian writer and musician

See also
Maddock (disambiguation)
Maddox (disambiguation)